Hrib is a small settlement in the Municipality of Šmarješke Toplice in southeastern Slovenia. It lies on the left bank of the Krka River east of Bela Cerkev in the historical region of Lower Carniola. The municipality is now included in the Southeast Slovenia Statistical Region.

References

External links
Hrib at Geopedia

Populated places in the Municipality of Šmarješke Toplice